Technometrics is a journal of statistics for the physical, chemical, and engineering sciences, published quarterly since 1959 by the American Society for Quality and the American Statistical Association.

Statement of purpose 
The purpose of Technometrics is to contribute to the development and use of statistical methods in physical, chemical, and engineering sciences as well as information sciences and technology. This vision includes developments on the interface of statistics and computer science such as data mining, machine learning, large databases, and so on. The journal places a premium on clear communication among statisticians and practitioners of these sciences and an emphasis on the application of statistical concepts and methods to problems that occur in these fields. The journal will publish papers describing new statistical techniques, papers illustrating innovative application of known statistical methods, expository papers on particular statistical methods, and papers dealing with the philosophy and problems of applying statistical methods, when such papers are consistent with the journal's objective. Every article shall include adequate justification of the application of the technique, preferably by means of an actual application to a problem in the physical, chemical, engineering or information sciences. All papers must contain a short, clear summary of contents and conclusions. Mathematical derivations not essential to the flow of the text should be placed in an appendix or a supplementary file. Brief descriptions of problems requiring solution and short technical notes that clearly pertain to the journal's purpose will also be considered for publication. Concise letters to the editor will be published when they are considered timely and appropriate.

Editor 
V. Roshan Joseph, Georgia Institute of Technology

Book Reviews Editor 

S. Ejaz Ahmed, Brock University, Canada

Former Editors 

 J. Stuart Hunter (1959–1963) 
    Fred C. Leone (1964–1968) 
    Harry Smith, Jr. (1969–1971) 
    Donald A. Gardiner (1972–1974)
    William H. Lawton (1975–1977) 
    John W. Wilkinson (1978–1980 
    Robert G. Easterling (1981–1983) 
    Jerald F. Lawless (1984–1986) 
    William Q. Meeker, Jr. (1987–1989)
    Vijayan Nair (1990–1992) 
    Stephen B. Vardeman (1993–1995) 
    Max Morris (1996–1998) 
    Karen Kafadar (1999–2001) 
    William I. Notz (2002–2004) 
    Randy R. Sitter (2005–2007) 
    David M. Steinberg (2008–2010) 
    Hugh A. Chipman (2011–2013)
    Peihua Qiu (2014–2016)
    Daniel Apley (2017-2019)

References

External links
Official website
Home page on the American Statistical Association website

American Statistical Association academic journals
Statistics journals
Computational statistics journals
Publications established in 1959